Northwest College is a public community college in Powell, Wyoming.

History
Northwest College opened in 1946, as the "University of Wyoming Northwest Center," with the support of the University of Wyoming and the local school district. University support ended in 1950, and the current name was adopted in 1989.

Notable people
Chris Boucher, basketball player for the Oregon Ducks men's basketball team and Toronto Raptors National Basketball Association
John Johnson, National Basketball Association player, 12 NBA Seasons, First Team All American at University of Iowa
Monte Olsen, ski instructor and Wyoming legislator

References

External links
 Official website

1946 establishments in Wyoming
Buildings and structures in Park County, Wyoming
Community colleges in Wyoming
Education in Park County, Wyoming
Educational institutions established in 1946
Powell, Wyoming
NJCAA athletics